Yoyetta is a genus of cicadas in the family Cicadidae. The genus was erected in 2012 to accommodate nine Australian species previously assigned to the genus Cicadetta.

There are currently more than 20 described species in Yoyetta, all found in Australia.

Species
These species belong to the genus Yoyetta:

 Yoyetta aaede (F.Walker, 1850) (adelaide firetail)
 Yoyetta abdominalis (Distant, 1892) (golden-haired firetail)
 Yoyetta celis (Moulds, 1988) (silver princess)
 Yoyetta cumberlandi Emery, Emery & Popple, 2015 (Cumberland ambertail)
 Yoyetta denisoni (Distant, 1893) (black firetail)
 Yoyetta electrica Emery, Emery & Popple, 2019
 Yoyetta fluviatilis Emery, Emery & Popple, 2015 (River ambertail)
 Yoyetta grandis Emery, Emery & Popple, 2019 (red-eyed firetail)
 Yoyetta humphreyae (varied ambertail)
 Yoyetta hunterorum (Moulds, 1988) (sydney treetop ticker)
 Yoyetta incepta (F.Walker, 1850)
 Yoyetta kershawi (victorian firetail)
 Yoyetta landsboroughi (Distant, 1882) (small bassian ambertail)
 Yoyetta nigrimontana Emery, Emery & Popple, 2015
 Yoyetta regalis Emery, Emery & Popple, 2019 (Red ringer)
 Yoyetta repetens Emery, Emery & Popple, 2015 (zipping ambertail)
 Yoyetta robertsonae Moulds, Popple & Emery, 2020 (clicking ambertail)
 Yoyetta serrata Emery, Emery & Popple, 2019 (serrated firetail)
 Yoyetta spectabilis Emery, Emery & Popple, 2019 (wavering firetail)
 Yoyetta subalpina Emery, Emery & Popple, 2019 (subalpine firetail)
 Yoyetta timothyi Emery, Emery & Popple, 2019 (Brown firetail)
 Yoyetta toowoombae (Distant, 1915)
 Yoyetta tristrigata (Goding & Froggatt, 1904)
 Yoyetta verrens Emery, Emery & Popple, 2019

References

Further reading

 
 
 
 

Cicadas
Auchenorrhyncha genera